Marco Pezzaiuoli (born 16 November 1968) is a German professional football manager.

Coaching career

Karlsruher SC
Pezzaiuoli had two stints as interim head coach of Karlsruher SC. The first stint happened after Joachim Löw resigned on 20 April 2000. Stefan Kuntz eventually took over the next season. Pezzaiuoli's second stint as interim head coach happened after Kunz was sacked on 25 September 2002. Lorenz-Günther Köstner was hired on 1 October 2002. He went to coach different teams with in the German Football Association and was an assistant coach for Suwon Samsung Bluewings in South Korea after leaving Karlsruhe.

Eintracht Trier
Pezzaiuoli was hired by Oberliga outfit Eintracht Trier on 20 September 2006 and given a contract to the end of the season. Pezzaiuoli lost his first match in charge 6–5 to EGC Wirges. Pezzaiuoli was sacked after five matches on 30 October 2006; losing three matches.  His final match was a 2–1 loss to Eintracht Bad Kreuznach.

1899 Hoffenheim
On 2 January 2011, Pezzaiuoli became new head coach of 1899 Hoffenheim. The club announced on 12 April 2011 that he will leave at the end of the season, recently having won only one out of eight games. Holger Stanislawski replaced Pezzaiuoli on 17 May 2011; three days after his final match.

Cerezo Osaka
On 16 June 2014, Cerezo Osaka named Pezzaiuoli as their head coach replacing Ranko Popović, but he was relieved of his duties on 8 September after failing to register a single win in the J. League. His team did manage a Japanese Emperor's Cup win against Kataller Toyama by 1–0 and a second leg quarter-final win away at Kawasaki Frontale in the J. League Cup. Unfortunately his team lost that tie on aggregate and, as had been rumoured for more than a week Pezzaiuoli was on his way home.

Bengaluru FC
On 12 February 2021, Pezzaiuoli was appointed as the head coach of Indian Super League club Bengaluru FC on a three year performance based contract.

The first game (unofficial) of Pezzaiuoli with Bengaluru was against FC Goa on 7 April 2021. Cleiton Silva's strike ensured of first win for Pezzaiuoli at Bengaluru FC. His first official game was against Nepal Army Club at 2021 AFC Cup preliminary round 1 against whom they won by 5–0 margin.

On 08 June 2022, Bengaluru FC announced the departure of Pezzaiuoli.

Managerial statistics

References

External links

1968 births
Living people
German footballers
German football managers
Bundesliga managers
Karlsruher SC managers
TSG 1899 Hoffenheim managers
Sportspeople from Mannheim
German people of Italian descent
German expatriate sportspeople in Japan
J1 League managers
Cerezo Osaka managers
Expatriate football managers in Japan
Association footballers not categorized by position
Footballers from Baden-Württemberg
Guangzhou F.C. non-playing staff
Association football coaches